Ivor Leroy Phillips (born 3 August 1935) is a South African former cricketer and tennis player. 

Phillips attended Queen's College in Queenstown, where he excelled at sports. He was offered a scholarship to Stellenbosch University, but instead returned to work on the family farm at Tarkastad. Among a group of young South African tennis players, including his fellow Border cricketer Buster Farrer, Phillips competed at the 1956 Wimbledon Championships. He and Farrer won their first-round match in the men's doubles, but lost in the second.

Phillips played as a middle-order batsman in three first-class matches for Border in 1957–58 and 1958–59. He played for the South African Country Districts XI for 19 years, captaining them for 16 years.

He later farmed in the Molteno district before retiring in 1999. He and his wife Leslie-Anne live in Port Alfred. They have four children. Their sons James and Leroy played first-class cricket in South Africa.

See also
 List of Border representative cricketers

References

External links
 

1935 births
Living people
Alumni of Queen's College Boys' High School
South African cricketers
South African male tennis players
Border cricketers
People from Queenstown, South Africa
Cricketers from the Eastern Cape